Csáki or Csáky is a Hungarian family name. It may refer to:

Viktória Csáki, Hungarian handballer 
András Csáki, Hungarian musician
Csaba Csáki, Hungarian theoretical physicist
György Csáki,  a Count of the Székelys (1402–1403)
Marianne Csaky,  Hungarian writer
Mihály Csáky (1492–1572), Hungarian noble and statesman
Josef Csàky, Hungarian artist and sculptor
István Csáky (1894–1941), Hungarian politician
Pál Csáky, Slovak politician,  of Hungarian minority
Imre Csáky (cardinal)
Imre Csáky (Minister of Foreign Affairs)
Albin Csáky (1841–1912), Hungarian politician
Károly Csáky (1873–1945), Hungarian military officer and politician

See also
Csák (disambiguation)

Hungarian-language surnames